Jesús Gómez may refer to:

Jesús Gómez (equestrian) (1941–2017), Mexican equestrian
Jesús Gómez (handballer) (born 1965), Spanish handball player
Jesús Gómez Alonso (1952–2006), Spanish social scientist
Alejandro Gómez (Bolivian footballer), born Jesús Alejandro Gómez Lanza (born 1979), Bolivian footballer
Jesús Alejandro Gómez (Mexican footballer) (born 2002), Mexican footballer
Jesús Gómez (footballer, born 1984) (born 1984), Venezuelan footballer
Jesús Gómez (runner) (born 1991), Spanish middle-distance runner
Jesús Gómez (sprinter) (born 1999), Spanish sprinter